Events in the year 1904 in India.

Incumbents
 Emperor of India – Edward VII
 Viceroy of India – George Curzon, 1st Marquess Curzon of Kedleston

Events
 National income - 8,840 million
 The gun carriage factory is established in Jabalpur
 31 October – The Kumbakonam Bank Limited, is incorporated as a limited company (later known as the City Union Bank)
 The secret Abhinav Bharat Society is founded by extremist Vinayak Damodar Savarkar

Law
 Raleigh Bill became Indian Universities Act
 18 March, the Ancient Monuments Preservation Act is passed

Births
28 March – V. Nagayya, actor, composer, director, producer, writer and playback singer (died 1973).
29 July – J. R. D. Tata a French-born Indian aviator and businessman who became India's first licensed pilot (died 1993).
8 August – Tribhuvan Narain Singh, Chief Minister of Uttar Pradesh (died 1982).
26 August – C. R. Kesavan Vaidyar, social activist and industrialist (died 1999).
1 October – A. K. Gopalan, communist leader (died 1977).
2 October – Lal Bahadur Shastri, politician and 2nd Prime Minister of India (died 1966).
29 December  Kuvempu, poet, writer and playwright (died 1994).

Full date unknown
Majnun Gorakhpuri, writer and literary critic (died 1988).
Gorur Ramaswamy Iyengar, writer (died 1991).
Murad, actor (died 1989).

Deaths

References

 
India
Years of the 20th century in India